Nicola Stephenson (born 5 July 1971) is an English actress. She played the roles of Margaret Clemence in Brookside, Julie Fitzjohn in Holby City, Sarah Williams in The Chase, Allie Westbrook in Waterloo Road, and Tess Harris in Emmerdale.

Life and career

She was born in Oldham, Lancashire and attended North Chadderton School for her secondary education.

Career
She is known mainly for her roles in television, which include Margaret Clemence in Channel 4's Brookside; Stephenson's on-air kiss with Anna Friel (Beth Jordache) was the first pre-watershed lesbian kiss to be broadcast on British television. In 2012 the kiss was broadcast to over 5 billion people when it was included as part of the London 2012 Olympics opening ceremony directed by Danny Boyle. The opening ceremony was broadcast uncensored in 76 countries where homosexuality is illegal and therefore became the first homosexual kiss to be broadcast in these countries. Other roles have included Julie Fitzjohn/Bradford in Holby City, Suzie Davidson in Clocking Off, Jackie Armstrong in ITV's Christmas Lights/Northern Lights/City Lights, Sarah Williams in BBC's The Chase and All at Sea. In 2012, Nicola played Louise, a series lead in the ITV drama Homefront. In 2014 she joined the regular cast of Waterloo Road as art teacher Allie Westbrook for 11 episodes.

Her theatre roles include A Patriot for Me at the Royal Shakespeare Company, directed by Peter Gill, His Girl Friday and Edmund at the National Theatre, directed by Ed Hall, and War Horse at the New London Theatre in London's West End, directed by Marianne Elliot.

In 2007, she had a lead role in the BBC TV 3 part series Superstorm directed by Julian Simpson. In 2014 she worked with Simpson again when he directed her as a guest lead in the BBC TV series New Tricks.

She appeared in the ITV drama Safe House in early 2015.

From 2015 to 2016, she played the part of Tess Harris in the soap-opera Emmerdale. Her five-month stint on the serial came to a sudden end when her character was killed off in a hit-and-run incident. Stephenson's role in the soap also reunited her with her co-star from The Chase, Gaynor Faye, who had played the character of Megan Macey since 2012.

Filmography

Personal life
Stephenson was in a relationship with actor Kieran O'Brien for eight years. The relationship ended in 1999. Nicola has two daughters, one named Esme Rose Stephenson born in 2008 daughter of Director Ian Curtis, and one named Iris Lilly Stephenson, born in 2010 daughter of Paul Stephenson. She is currently married to artist Paul Stephenson.

References

External links

1971 births
Living people
Actresses from Oldham
People educated at North Chadderton School
21st-century English actresses
English television actresses
English soap opera actresses
Actresses from Lancashire
Place of birth missing (living people)